Vilmos Gryllus (October 28, 1951) is a Hungarian musician, performer and composer, founding member of folk music group Kaláka; winner of the Kossuth Prize (2000).

Background
He was born in Budapest to Vilmos Gryllus and Éva Fogarassy. His elder brother is musician Dániel Gryllus, also a founding member of Kaláka. Gryllus studied at the Faculty of Architecture of the Budapest University of Technology and Economics, graduating in 1976.

In 1969 he founded Kaláka together with his brother, István Mikó and Balázs Radványi. In 1980 he led a radio show called Ki kopog? ("Who's Knocking?") along with Péter Levente and Ildikó Döbrentey. In 1991 he and Péter Levente created the successful children's TV show Égbőlpottyant mesék ("Tales from the Sky") where children could send their drawings to them and they would create tales based on the drawings.

Since 1996 he's been performing with Kaláka again, with a repertoire consisting of poems set to music.

Awards
 Kossuth Prize (2000)
 Prima Primissima Prize (for Kaláka, 2004)

Sources
 MTI ki kicsoda 2009. ed. Hermann Péter. Budapest: Magyar Távirati Iroda. 2008. 
 Gryllus family home page
 Kaláka home page

External links
 

Hungarian folk musicians
Hungarian composers
Hungarian male composers
1951 births
Living people